Vladimir Vlasov (born 6 July 1958) is a Soviet ski jumper. He competed in the normal hill and large hill events at the 1980 Winter Olympics.

References

1958 births
Living people
Soviet male ski jumpers
Olympic ski jumpers of the Soviet Union
Ski jumpers at the 1980 Winter Olympics
Place of birth missing (living people)